Rephoel Baruch Sorotzkin (February 5, 1917 - February 10, 1979) was the Rosh Yeshiva of the Telz Yeshiva in Cleveland and among American Jewry's foremost religious leaders.

He was born on February 5, 1917 (13th of Shevat, 5677) in Zhetl, in the Grodno Governorate of the Russian Empire (present-day Belarus). His father, Rabbi Zalman Sorotzkin was the town's rabbi.
As a young man, Sorotzkin studied under Rabbi Elchonon Wasserman in the Baranovich Yeshiva, and then under Rabbi Baruch Ber Lebovitz in Kamenitz.

In 1940, Rabbi Boruch Sorotzkin married Rochel Bloch, daughter of the Telzer Rav and Rosh Yeshiva, Rabbi Avraham Yitzchak Bloch. 

Sorotzkin was involved in the "tension" over visas needed to flee: the two factions were "those from Lithuanian versus Polish Yeshivot;" control of the Kobe committee was by "students from the Polish yeshivot." The rabbi and his wife fled Europe at the start of World War II, via Shanghai, and made their way to the United States. There, they joined his wife's uncles (and his own cousins) Rabbi Eliyahu Meir Bloch and Rabbi Chaim Mordechai Katz who had re-established the Telz Yeshiva in Cleveland, Ohio.

Teaching
In 1943 Sorotzkin began delivering classes in the yeshiva. 
In 1953 Sorotzkin was appointed associate dean of the yeshiva.

In 1962 Sorotzkin became dangerously ill and the name Rephoel was added to his name.
In 1964, when the Telz Rosh Yeshiva, Rabbi Chaim Mordechai Katz died, Sorotzkin together with Rabbi Mordechai Gifter assumed the leadership of the yeshiva.

In the Telzer tradition, Rabbi Sorotzkin extended his sphere of activities to include even more areas of communal responsibility, such as working for Chinuch Atzmai, Torah Umesorah and Agudath Israel of America where he served as one of the youngest member of its Moetzes Gedolei HaTorah - Council of Torah Sages.

In 1977, with the establishment of the Yeshiva in Israel, Rabbi Mordechai Gifter left to head the Yeshiva in Israel.

Sorotzkin died on Saturday, February 10, 1979. The Hebrew date - 13 Shevat - was the same date as his birthday.
He is buried on Har HaMenuchot.

Family
He is survived by two sons and three daughters.

His daughter Rebetzin Rassia Busel died in March 1998.

His sons: 
Rabbi Yitzchok Sorotzkin serves as dean of the Telz Yeshiva and Mesivta of Lakewood, New Jersey
Rabbi Binyomin Sorotzkin is dean of Ateres Shlomo in Israel
Rabbi Eliyahu Meir Sorotzkin was dean of Yeshiva Tiferes Boruch Of North Plainfield, New Jersey, he died on November 27, 2020.

His sons-in-law:
Rabbi Yaakov Busel was dean of RJJ of Edison, New Jersey. Rabbi Busel died on November 3, 2020. 
Rabbi Aryeh Schulman is rabbi of Kiryat Telz-Stone, Israel
Rabbi Nosson Boruch Herzka was a  Rabbi and prominent Torah scholar in Lakewood, New Jersey. Rabbi Herzka died on December 8, 2018.
Rabbi Yisroel Brog is dean of Tiferes Avigdor Wickliffe, Ohio.

Many of his lectures on Talmud have been posthumously published, under the title Sefer Habinah V’habrachah, by his children. Rabbi Sorotzkin's wife died in November 2006.

References 

1917 births
1979 deaths
People from Dzyatlava
People from Slonimsky Uyezd
Belarusian Haredi rabbis
Rosh yeshivas
American Haredi rabbis
Moetzes Gedolei HaTorah
Burials at Har HaMenuchot
Rabbis from Ohio